Trichoderes is a genus of beetles in the family Cerambycidae, containing the following species:

 Trichoderes cylindroidus (Bates, 1884)
 Trichoderes pini Chevrolat, 1843
 Trichoderes rugosus Bates, 1884

References

Prioninae